The Deputy Chief of the Naval Staff (DCNS) are several very important administrative senior military appointments and principle staff commands, headed and commanded by the Principal Staff Officers (PSOs) at the NHQ. They are also the commander of their respective branch in the Pakistan Navy and these commands are held by senior flag officers of Rear Admiral and Vice Admiral rank in the Navy and are directly reporting and functioning under the Chief of the Naval Staff. DCNS appointments play a very important administrative role for the proper functioning of an entire navy. The DCNS appointments ranges from rear admiral to vice admiral rank depending on assignment nature.

Naval Headquarters

Principle Staff Commands and Principle Staff Officers
Due to the influence from the Royal Navy and later by the United States Navy since its earliest inception, the Pakistan Navy has a unique command structure and the Navy's functionality is divided in various branches there are seven military branches also known as Staff Commands in the navy that are in fact administrative directed by the several appointed Deputy Chief of the Naval Staff (DCNS) and they operate from NHQ.

See also
Chief of the Naval Staff
Vice Chief of the Naval Staff
Deputy Chief of the Air Staff (Pakistan)

References

Source: Pakistan Navy Official Website PN Organizations}

External links
Official website of Pakistan Navy
However, the most senior admiral in the Navy, Admiral Mohammad Zakaullah, was instead promoted to the four-star appointment. He continued serving as the DCNS (Operations) at the Navy NHQ.

Government of Pakistan
Pakistan Navy